The Tenth Army was a field army of the British Army during the Second World War  created in Iraq and formed from the major part of "Paiforce" (Persia and Iraq Force). It was active in 1942 and 1943, and then disbanded.

In April 1941, British and Indian troops had been deployed to Iraq from India under the command of Lieutenant-General Sir Edward P. Quinan to protect British interests, in particular oil concessions, after a coup d'etat had brought to power a government sympathetic to the Axis powers. The force was known as Iraqforce and was engaged in the Anglo-Iraqi War which took place in April and May Iraqi rebellion and took part in the defeat of the Vichy forces in the subsequent Syria-Lebanon campaign. Later in 1941, the force took part in the Anglo-Soviet invasion of Iran to prevent the Axis elements from entering Persia, and preventing the possibility of the Germans gaining control of the Iraqi and Persian oil fields. Following this Iraqforce was renamed Paiforce (Persia and Iraq force).

After the campaigns of 1941, Quinan's headquarters was redesignated Tenth Army and its main task was the maintenance of the lines of communication to the Soviet Union from the Persian Gulf to the Caspian and the protection of the South Persian and Iraqi oilfields. Its badge was a golden Assyrian Ox with human head and eagle's wings (a Cherub Guardian). A variation of colouring of this badge was a white Ox on a pale blue background. Quinan was knighted in June 1942 and in August 1942, he was promoted to be a full general. Tenth Army was initially part of Middle East Command but became part of Persia and Iraq Command when it was activated in September 1942.

Order of Battle 1942
 Tenth Army commanded by Lieutenant-General Sir Edward Quinan
 31st Indian Armoured Division - Major-General Robert Wordsworth
 3rd Indian Motor Brigade - Brigadier A.A.E. Filoze
 252nd Indian Armoured Brigade - Brigadier G. Carr-White
 British III Corps, Lieutenant-General Sir Desmond Anderson
 5th Infantry Division, Major-General Horatio Berney-Ficklin
 13th Infantry Brigade - Brigadier V.C. Russell
 15th Infantry Brigade - Brigadier H.R.N. Greenfield
 17th Infantry Brigade - Brigadier G.W.B. Tarleton
 5th Reconnaissance Regiment, Reconnaissance Corps
 Indian XXI Corps, Lieutenant-General Sir Mosley Mayne
 8th Indian Infantry Division, Major-General Charles Harvey
 17th Indian Infantry Brigade - Brigadier F.A.M.B. Jenkins
 19th Indian Infantry Brigade - Brigadier C.W.W. Ford
 10th Indian Infantry Division - Major-General Alan Blaxland
 20th Indian Infantry Brigade - Brigadier L.E. MacGregor
 25th Indian Infantry Brigade - Brigadier A.E. Arderne
 6th Indian Infantry Division - Major-General J.N. Thomson
 27th Indian Infantry Brigade - Brigadier A.R. Barker
 6th Duke of Connaught's Own Lancers
 10th Indian Motor Brigade - Brigadier Harold Redman
 56th (London) Infantry Division, Major-General Eric Miles
 167th (London) Infantry Brigade - Brigadier J.C.A. Birch
 168th (London) Infantry Brigade - Brigadier K.C. Davidson
 169th (London) Infantry Brigade - Brigadier L.O. Lyne

References

1942 establishments in the United Kingdom
1943 disestablishments in the United Kingdom
Military units and formations established in 1942
Military units and formations disestablished in 1943
10
10
Military units and formations of the British Empire in World War II
Cherubim